SH3-containing GRB2-like protein 3-interacting protein 1 is a protein that in humans is encoded by the SGIP1 gene.

References

Further reading